This is a list of roads designated A8:

 A008 road (Argentina), a beltway around the city of Rosario
 A8 highway (Australia) may refer to :
 A8 highway (Tasmania), a road connecting Launceston and Low Head 
 A8 highway (Victoria), a road connecting Melbourne and Adelaide
 A8 (Sydney), a road in the northern beaches of Sydney
 A8 motorway (Austria), from the A1-A9 junction in Austria to the German border where it joins Bundesautobahn 3
 A8 road (China) may refer to :
 A8 expressway (Shanghai), a road connecting Xinzhuang Interchange and Hangzhou
 A8 motorway (Croatia), a road connecting Kanfanar near Rovinj and Matulji near Rijeka
 A8 motorway (France), a road connecting Aix-en-Provence and the A7 to the Côte d'Azur
 A8 motorway (Germany), a road connecting the Luxembourg and Austrian borders
 A8 motorway (Greece), a road connecting Athens and Patras
 A8 motorway (Italy), a road connecting Varese and Milan
 A8 road (Latvia), a road connecting Riga and Jelgava to the Lithuanian border 
 A8 highway (Lithuania), a road connecting Panevėžys and Sitkūnai
 A8 motorway (Netherlands), a road connecting Amsterdam and Zaandijk
 A8 highway (Nigeria), a road connecting Numan and Jimeta in Adamawa State
 A8 autostrada (Poland), a road bypassing the city of Wrocław
 A8 motorway (Portugal), a road connecting Lisbon and Leiria via Caldas da Rainha
 A8 motorway (Romania), a planned road connecting the historical regions of Moldavia and Transylvania
 A-8 motorway (Spain), a road connecting Bilbao and Baamonde in Galicia
 A 8 road (Sri Lanka), a road connecting Panadura and Ratnapura
 A8 motorway (Switzerland), a road connecting Spiez and Lucerne
 A8 road (United Kingdom) may refer to :
 A8 road (Northern Ireland), a road connecting Larne and Belfast
 A8 road (Scotland), a road connecting Edinburgh to Greenock
 A8 road (United States of America) may refer to :
 County Route A8 (California), a road in Tehama County connecting SR 99 in Tehama and SR 36 in Red Bluff 
 A8 road (Zimbabwe), a planned road
 Batu Gajah Highway, a road in Perak, Malaysia

See also
 List of highways numbered 8